Gowhar Kuh Shahrak (also Romanized as Gowhar Kūh Shahrak; also known as Gohar Kūh, Gowhar Kūh, and Gwār Kūh) is a village in Gowhar Kuh Rural District, Nukabad District, Khash County, Sistan and Baluchestan Province, Iran. At the 2006 census, its population was 985, in 192 families.

References 

Populated places in Khash County